Morten Ludvig Sundt (6 April 1809 – 1 June 1891) was a Norwegian farmer and politician.

He was the mayor of Hole from 1850 to 1866. 
He was elected to the Parliament of Norway in 1851, representing the rural constituency of Buskeruds Amt. He was re-elected in 1854, 1857, 1859, 1862 and 1865. He owned the farm By Søndre in Hole and is credited for his role in the development of the Ringerike potato (Ringerikspotet).

References

External links
Ringerikspotet fra Ringerike

1809 births
Year of death missing
People from Hole, Norway
Norwegian farmers
Mayors of places in Buskerud
Members of the Storting